Marlena Shaw (born Marlina Burgess, September 22, 1942) is an American jazz, blues and soul singer. Shaw began her singing career in the 1960s and is still singing today. Her music has often been sampled in hip hop music, and used in television commercials.

Early life
Marlena Shaw was born in New Rochelle, New York. She was first introduced to music by her uncle Jimmy Burgess, a jazz trumpet player. In an interview with The New York Times, she told the reporter: "He [Jimmy Burgess] introduced me to good music through records – Dizzy [Gillespie], Miles [Davis], a lot of gospel things, and Al Hibbler, who really knows how to phrase a song." In 1952, Burgess brought her on stage at the Apollo Theater in Harlem to sing with his band. Shaw's mother did not want Marlena to go on tour with her uncle at such a young age. Shaw enrolled in the New York State Teachers College in Potsdam (now known as the State University of New York at Potsdam) to study music but she later dropped out.

Career
Shaw began to make singing appearances in jazz clubs whenever she could spare the time. The most notable of these appearances was in 1963 when she worked with jazz trumpeter Howard McGhee. She was supposed to play at the Newport Jazz Festival with McGhee and his band, but left the group after getting into an argument with one of the band members. Later that year, she got an audition with Columbia label talent scout John Hammond. Shaw did not perform well during the audition because she was too nervous. Undeterred, she continued to play small clubs until 1966. Her career took off in 1966 when she landed a gig with the Playboy Club chain in Chicago. It was through this gig that she met with representatives of the Chess Records music label, and soon signed with them. She released her first two albums on their subsidiary Cadet Records. A 1969 album track "California Soul", a funk-soul tune written by Ashford & Simpson and originally issued as a single by American pop quintet The 5th Dimension, later became a staple of the UK rare groove scene. This song has appeared in television commercials for Dockers, KFC and Dodge Ram trucks. Unable to find her own style at Chess, she moved to the jazz-oriented Blue Note Records in 1972.

In 1977 she released an LP Sweet Beginnings on Columbia that contained: "Yu Ma / Go Away Little Boy", a medley containing the old Goffin and Carole King standard, originally recorded by Nancy Wilson. The album also contained the track Look at Me, Look at You, popular on the U.K. rare groove scene. She sings the theme song "Don't Ask to Stay Until Tomorrow" from the 1977 film Looking for Mr. Goodbar that's also found on its soundtrack. She also recorded one of the disco era's biggest hits, a remake of "Touch Me in the Morning", also on Columbia Records.

In 1982 Marlena recorded the Gary Taylor ballad called "Without You in My Life" from the LP Let Me in Your Life that was jointly produced by Johnny Bristol and Webster Lewis on South Bay records. This had moderate chart success in the USA. In 1983 she recorded the vocals for "Could It Be You", a track by Phil Upchurch on his Name of the Game album.

Shaw still performs and records today. In 1999, 2001 and again in 2007, Shaw was one of the performers at the North Sea Jazz Festival in the Netherlands.

Discography

Albums

As guest
With Benny Carter
 Benny Carter Songbook (MusicMasters, 1996)
 Benny Carter Songbook Volume II (MusicMasters, 1997)

With Buddy Montgomery
 Ties of Love (Landmark, 1987)

With T-Square (band)
 Vocal2 (or Vocal Square) (Sony Music Entertainment (Japan), 2002)

Singles

As lead artist

References

External links
Marlena Shaw interview by Pete Lewis, 'Blues & Soul' February 09

Musicians from New Rochelle, New York
Jazz-blues musicians
Living people
Cadet Records artists
Blue Note Records artists
American jazz singers
Northern soul musicians
Jazz musicians from New York (state)
21st-century African-American women singers
20th-century African-American women singers
1942 births